A' Mhòine is a peninsula in the Highlands, Scotland. The peninsula is bounded to the west by Loch Eriboll, and to the east by the Kyle of Tongue. The A838 road crosses the peninsula on an east–west axis. Much of the peninsula is owned by Melness Estate on behalf of 59 crofters.

The peninsula contains large areas of blanket bog covering , forming part of the Flow Country. Eriboll East and Whiten Head, at the western and northern sides of the peninsula, are designated as part of a special landscape area, and the bog is one of 2 Sites of Special Scientific Interest (SSSIs) on the peninsula. The peninsula sits within both a Special Protection Area and a Special Area of Conservation titled the Caithness and Sutherland Peatlands, and is home to greylag geese, golden eagles and dunlin, as well as "rare water-dependent plants, dwarf shrubs and alpine heath".

Moine path 
The path runs around the northern end of Ben Hope and is popular with walkers. Its origins are unclear but it is thought to have been a drovers' road.

Sutherland spaceport project 

In 2018, the peninsula was selected by Highlands and Islands Enterprise as the site for Sutherland spaceport, which would be the United Kingdom's first spaceport. Launches could first take place by 2023.

Permission to build the spaceport has been opposed by a holding objection from the Wildland company of billionaire Danish couple Anne and Anders Povlson, who argue that the area is protected under the Ramsar Convention, a 1971 treaty covering internationally important wetlands, ratified by the UK in 1976. The Melness Estate is in favour of the project, however, as rent from the spaceport and profit-sharing could help fund efforts to regenerate the peat bog and invest in the local community. In June 2020, The Highland Council provided planning permission for the £17 million project, allowing 12 launches a year.  the Scottish Land Court has yet to adjudicate on the change in land use.

References

External links

Landforms of Sutherland
Peninsulas of Scotland